The 1958 NCAA Tennis Championships were the 13th annual NCAA-sponsored tournaments to determine the national champions of men's singles, doubles, and team collegiate tennis in the United States.

USC won the team championship, the Trojans' fourth such title. USC finished four points ahead of Stanford, 13–9, in the final team standings.

Host site
This year's tournaments were contested at the United States Naval Academy in Annapolis, Maryland.

Team scoring
Until 1977, the men's team championship was determined by points awarded based on individual performances in the singles and doubles events.

References

External links
List of NCAA Men's Tennis Champions

NCAA Division I tennis championships
NCAA Division I Tennis Championships
NCAA Division I Tennis Championships